White is a lunar impact crater. It lies on the far side of the Moon from the Earth, to the southwest of the huge walled plain Apollo. About one crater diameter to the south-southwest is the small  crater Hendrix.

This is a relatively fresh crater with a well-defined rim and interior that have not been significantly worn. There is a small, cup-shaped crater attached to the exterior along the western edge. The inner wall of White displays some slight terracing, and there is a low central ridge near the midpoint of the interior.

The crater is named after astronaut Ed White, killed in the Apollo 1 fire.  The nearby craters Grissom and Chaffee were named after the other two astronauts killed in the disaster, Gus Grissom and  Roger Chaffee.

Satellite craters
By convention these features are identified on lunar maps by placing the letter on the side of the crater midpoint that is closest to White.

References

 
 
 
 
 
 
 
 
 
 
 
 

Impact craters on the Moon
Ed White (astronaut)